Omniplex  may refer to:

 Omniplex Cinemas, a cinema group in Ireland
 Omniplex Science Museum, a previous name of the Science Museum Oklahoma